Craig Jones may refer to:
 Craig Jones (grappler) (born 1991), Australian grappler and Brazilian Jiu-Jitsu black belt competitor
 Craig Jones (musician) (born 1972), American musician
 Craig Jones (motorcyclist) (1985–2008), English motorcycle racer
 Craig Jones (cricketer) (born 1978), Australian cricketer
 Craig Jones (Royal Navy officer) (born 1968), British Royal Navy officer and LGBT rights defender in the UK Royal Navy
 Craig Jones (footballer, born 1977), Welsh footballer, current head coach of George Washington University's men's soccer team
 Craig Jones (footballer, born 1987), Welsh footballer
 Craig Jones (footballer, born 1989), English footballer
 Craig Jones (rower) (born 1972), Australian rower
 Craig Jones, fictional character in the Friday Movie franchise